George Hassell (5 October 1923 – 25 May 2012) was an Australian rules footballer who played for Essendon in the Victorian Football League (VFL).

Ascot Vale recruit George Hassell played in four successive Grand Finals from 1946 to 1949. A left footed wingman, he was a premiership player in his debut season as well as in 1949, the latter as a reserve. In between he participated in the 1947 and 1948 Grand Finals, both of which Essendon lost in close contests. He represented the Victorian interstate side in 1948.

References

Holmesby, Russell and Main, Jim (2007). The Encyclopedia of AFL Footballers. 7th ed. Melbourne: Bas Publishing.

External links

1923 births
Australian rules footballers from Victoria (Australia)
Essendon Football Club players
Essendon Football Club Premiership players
2012 deaths
Two-time VFL/AFL Premiership players